Pedro Miguel Tavares de Oliveira (born 16 January 1993 in Vale de Cambra) is a Portuguese footballer who plays for U.D. Oliveirense as a forward.

Football career
On 15 December 2013, Oliveira made his professional debut with Oliveirense in a 2013–14 Segunda Liga match against Portimonense.

References

External links

Stats and profile at LPFP 

1994 births
Living people
Portuguese footballers
Association football forwards
Liga Portugal 2 players
U.D. Oliveirense players